The Honda FC50, also known as the Honda Beat, is a  scooter manufactured by Honda in 1983. It was produced mainly for the Japanese domestic market — although both new and used models were exported from Japan—making it a fairly hard-to-find scooter. It was available in red, black, or white. 

The FC50 was powered by a single cylinder petrol two-stroke engine that was liquid cooled, making it one of the most powerful in its class. The small radiator was fitted behind the grill between the two headlights. It featured 12-volt electric start and CVT transmission; the transmission changed from low to high at around 5500 rpm. It had an automatic centrifugal clutch that engaged gradually from 3000 rpm.

It was made to carry only one person at a time and had no provisions for a passenger. It featured V-TACS; this was a small valve in the exhaust port that was operated (closed to activate) by a lever via the rider's left heel. Many other larger two-stroke engines use a similar system although most are engaged automatically by electric servos. V-TACS gave it more power from 5500 rpm (but it also made less power if engaged below 5500 rpm).

An expansion chamber and tuned length exhaust were fitted from factory although they were only "average" in design. Top speed was about  @ 11,000 rpm. Both front and back brakes were drum brakes. 

The dashboard had a tachometer (rpm), a speedometer, and gauges for engine temperature and fuel level. A small set of lights on the rpm dial illuminated when V-tacs was engaged; other lights on the dash lit up for turn signal, oil low (two-stroke oil) and high beam (head lights). A small light on the speed dial flashed when speed exceeded 35 km/h.

FC50
Motor scooters
Motorcycles introduced in 1983
Two-stroke motorcycles